The Manfreds is a British pop group, formed in 1991 as a reunion of former members of the 1960s pop group Manfred Mann, however without their eponymous founder Manfred Mann.

History
The original members of Manfred Mann, minus keyboard player Mann, reformed in 1991 to celebrate guitarist Tom McGuinness's 50th birthday, and to promote a Manfred Mann compilation released around the same time. The absence of Mann forced them to adopt a different name. Original singer Paul Jones, and his late-1960s replacement Mike D'Abo were involved, along with other members of Manfred Mann from their 1960s heyday including keyboard player Mike Hugg, Tom McGuinness and Mike Vickers with drummer Rob Townsend and originally Benny Gallagher on bass guitar. They decided to continue the reunion, and in 1999 released the album 5-4-3-2-1 on the BMG sublabel Camden, described by Allmusic as "very close to their original sound, only a bit slicker". Live album L.I.V.E. followed in 2000. They went on to release further albums in 2000 and 2003. The group later included Marcus Cliffe (bass) and Simon Currie (flute and sax).

They continued to perform live, fitting it in between their other individual commitments, with Jones, McGuinness, and Townsend also members of The Blues Band, Jones also continuing his solo career and acting, radio and television work, Hugg and Cliffe performing as part of a jazz trio, and D'Abo presenting radio shows and performing with The New Amen Corner.

In 2013 they toured nationally to support a new Manfred Mann compilation, and did so again in 2014 and 2016, and in 2017 to promote their new album, Makin' Tracks, featuring both Jones and D'Abo on vocals, as well as performances in Ireland.

Personnel
Current members
Paul Jones – vocals, harmonica (1991–present)
Mike Hugg – keyboards, percussion (1991–present)
Tom McGuinness – guitar, backing vocals (1991–present)
Mike d'Abo – vocals, keyboards (1991–present)
Rob Townsend – drums, percussion (1991–present)
Marcus Cliffe – bass guitar (1999–present)
Simon Currie – saxophone, flute (1999–present)
Former members

 Benny Gallagher – bass, backing vocals (1991–1999)
 Mike Vickers – saxophone, flute (1991–1999)

Discography

References

External links
 

British pop music groups
Musical groups established in 1991
1991 establishments in England